Fortunato Borbon (1890-1954) was Governor of Batangas province in the Philippines in the period immediately following World War II, from January 1945 to January 1946.

External links
List of Governors of Batangas from Batangan 

1954 deaths
1890 births
Governors of Batangas
Philippine Army personnel